The 4th Frigate Squadron was an operational squadron of the Royal Navy from 1948 to 2004.

History

Ships of the squadron saw service in the Korean War, the Beira Patrol, the Cod Wars, the Silver Jubilee Fleet Review, the Falklands War and the Second Gulf War.

In the 1970s Juno was one of the six Leanders used as the fictional "" for the BBC TV drama series Warship. All members of the crew were given Hero cap tallies for filming purposes.

The squadron was made up of Amazon class frigates in the 1980s. They were worked hard, performing extensive shore-bombardment missions and providing anti-submarine and anti-aircraft defence for the task force.

The squadron disbanded in 2004.

Captain (F), 4th Frigate Squadron

References

Frigate squadrons of the Royal Navy
Military units and formations disestablished in 2004